Heikant is a hamlet in the municipality of Waalre, in the Dutch province of North Brabant. It is located about 3 km south of the centre of Waalre.

References

Populated places in North Brabant
Waalre